Novokuznetsk Iron and Steel Plant is a major Russian steel producer in the city of Novokuznetsk in Kemerovo Oblast in southwestern Siberia. The company's name is abbreviated to NKMK (Russian:НКМК). The company specializes in the production of rails for railroads. NKMK is a subsidiary of the Evraz Group, a leading Russian steel company.  As of September 26, 2022, the Plant is on fire and major portions of it have burned down.

References

External links
Evraz Group list of subsidiaries 
NKMK at Evraz Group 

Evraz
Novokuznetsk
Steel companies of the Russian Soviet Federative Socialist Republic
Companies based in Kemerovo Oblast